Draconematidae is a family of nematodes belonging to the order Desmodorida.

Genera

Genera:
 Apenodraconema Allen & Noffsinger, 1978
 Bathychaetosoma Decraemer, Gourbault & Backeljau, 1997
 Cephalochaetosoma Kito, 1983

References

Nematodes